Ženski košarkaški klub Voždovac is a Serbian women's basketball club from Belgrade, Serbia.

History
In the 1971-72 season, the club won "The Double" - for the first time the Yugoslavian League, and the national cup, and played in the inaugural edition of FIBA Women's European Cup Winners' Cup (subsequently renamed Ronchetti Cup) two-legged final, against the eventual winners Spartak Leningrad.

Honours

Domestic
National Championships – 2

First League of SFR Yugoslavia:
Winners (2): 1972, 1975
Runners-up (3): 1974, 1982, 1983

National Cups – 2

Cup of SFR Yugoslavia:
Winners (2): 1972, 1984
Runners-up (1): 1974

International
International titles – 0
 FIBA Cup Winners Cup:
Runners-up (1): 1972

Notable former players

Notable former coaches
Miroljub Stojković
Slobodan Mićović
Aleksandar Stanimirović
Vladislav Lučić
Zoran Tir

See also 
 List of basketball clubs in Serbia by major honours won

External links
 Profile on eurobasket.com
 Profile on srbijasport.net

 
Vozdovac
Vozdovac
Vozdovac
Vozdovac
Vozdovac
1955 establishments in Serbia